Brady White is an American football quarterback for the Memphis Showboats of the United States Football League (USFL). He began his college football career at Arizona State University, before becoming a graduate transfer to the University of Memphis.

Early years
White was unanimously rated a four-star recruit and a top-10 national quarterback prospect by every major publication. Selected to participate in the U.S. Army All-American Bowl, White was the starting quarterback for the West. He was one of 16 nominees for the U.S. Army National Player of the Year in 2014 and threw for 3,725 yards with 45 passing touchdowns in 12 games as a senior, earning Second-Team All-America honors by MaxPreps as a junior. He is regarded as one of ASU's highest recruits.

College career

Arizona State
As a freshman White was injured and missed most of his first and all of his second season.  He earned his bachelor's degree in business from Arizona State in December 2017.

Memphis
After graduating from Arizona State, White announced on January 16, 2018 that he was going to be a graduate transfer to the University of Memphis. In May 2019, he was granted an extra year of eligibility due to his injury at ASU.  Earning his master's degree in sports commerce in August 2019, White enrolled in the university's doctoral program in liberal studies in Fall 2019. On January 6, 2021, The National Football Foundation (NFF) & College Hall of Fame awarded him The William V. Campbell Trophy® as the top college football scholar-athlete in the nation.

Professional career
After going undrafted in the 2021 NFL Draft, White received a training camp invite with the Tennessee Titans but did not receive a contract.

Tampa Bay Bandits
White was selected with the seventh pick of the 12th round of the 2022 USFL Draft by the Tampa Bay Bandits.

Memphis Showboats
On November 15, 2022, when the USFL announced the Memphis Showboats, White, and every other Tampa Bay Bandit player was transferred to the Showboats.

References

External links
 Memphis Tigers bio
 

1996 births
Living people
American football quarterbacks
Arizona State Sun Devils football players
Memphis Tigers football players
People from Newhall, Santa Clarita, California
Sportspeople from Santa Clarita, California
Players of American football from California
Tampa Bay Bandits (2022) players